Duli Pengiran Muda Mahkota Football Club (His Royal Highness the Crown Prince of Brunei Football Club in English, commonly known as DPMM FC) is a professional football club based in Bandar Seri Begawan, Brunei. The club played in the Brunei Premier League in the early 2000s, winning the league title in 2002 and 2004.

The club then decided to play in Malaysia, and joined the Malaysian Premier League as a foreign-based team in for the 2005–06 season. They won promotion to the Malaysian Super League (the top tier of Malaysian football) at the end of their first season in Malaysian football, and then finished 3rd and 10th in the following two season in the Super League. The club then left the Malaysian league and joined Singapore's S.League for the 2009 season. They won the Singapore League Cup, but were forced to withdraw from the league competition five games before the end of the season after FIFA suspended the Football Association of Brunei Darussalam for government interference in its affairs, thus barring teams from Brunei from taking part in overseas competitions. All the club's league results for 2009 were therefore expunged. At the end of the suspension, they re-entered the S.League and won the title in 2015, just after a near-miss in 2014.

DPMM FC is owned by the Crown Prince of Brunei, Prince Al-Muhtadee Billah, who previously played as a goalkeeper for the team.

History

Beginnings in Brunei
DPMM FC started out as a college team in 1994, before being officially established as a commercial club in 2000. After being the most successful team in college-level football in Brunei, most of the team's talented players joined DPMM FC when it became a commercial team and the club became stronger and more established.

The club enjoyed considerable success in Brunei's domestic competitions in the early-2000s, winning the Brunei Premier League in 2002 and 2004, the Brunei FA Cup in 2004, and the Brunei Super Cup in 2002 and 2004.

Joining Malaysian league
In 2005, DPMM FC stopped playing in Brunei's domestic league and joined the Malaysia Premier League (the second tier of Malaysian football) as a foreign-based team, replacing the Brunei representative team. The club was then promoted to the top tier of Malaysian football, Malaysian Super League, where they finished in 3rd place in their first season (2006–07). In the following season (2007–08), they finished in 10th place. They then had to leave the Malaysia Super League due to the deregistration of the Brunei Football Association by the Registrar of Societies.

Since 2004, DPMM FC had also competed annually in the Singapore Cup (a knock-out tournament which the Football Association of Singapore invites a number of teams from other countries to take part in alongside Singaporean clubs).

S.League, and suspension

After leaving the Malaysia Super League, DPMM FC joined Singapore's S.League for the 2009 season, becoming the first team in the league to play their home matches outside Singapore. The club quickly made an impact on the Singapore football scene by winning the Singapore League Cup in June 2009. They defeated the Singapore Armed Forces Football Club (SAFFC) in the final on penalties after the match had ended in a 1–1 draw. However, on 30 September that year, FIFA suspended the Brunei Football Association for government interference in its affairs. This meant that teams from Brunei were no longer allowed to compete in tournaments run by other national member associations. The Football Association of Singapore appealed to FIFA to allow DPMM FC to finish the S.League season, but the appeal was rejected. The results of all DPMM's league matches for 2009 were therefore expunged.

Lifting of suspension, and success in Singapore
After 20 months of being suspended, FIFA has decided to lift the suspension off Brunei Darussalam. This means that the national team as well as the football teams from Brunei Darussalam are allowed to join any football competitions under FIFA. DPMM re-entered the S.League in 2012, and became dominant after the arrival of former English Premier League manager Steve Kean in 2014. They won their first S.League title in 2015, a year after losing ground in the final fixture of the 2014 season.

Intention to pull out of the S.League
Since the 2016 season, the Football Association of Singapore (FAS) has been reducing the number of imports allowed per S.League team. This has affected the Bruneian-based outfit greatly, with a lesser pool of local players against Singapore's (or Japan's in the case of Albirex Niigata (S)).

Towards the conclusion of the 2017 S.League in November, DPMM FC announced their intention on their website to possibly move to the Malaysian league, which they last appeared in 2008. This intention was later "dashed" by the FAM and in particular by Football Malaysia LLP, which stipulated that DPMM FC have to play their home games in Malaysia and to have a squad full of Malaysians with Bruneians regarded as import players. DPMM called these rulings "unprofessional" and "insane".

In late December, DPMM stated their intentions to join the Indonesian league for 2018 instead. This was made after a meeting between S.League clubs whereby new rules were set to restrict foreign imports to two, and the implementation of a youth-focused roster. However the move would be "technically impossible" to happen according to PSSI's secretary general a few days after the announcement was made.

Further talks with FAS made at the turn of the year resulted in a compromise that was reached on 10 January 2018, where the S.League competition organisers would allow them to sign up to 3 foreign players instead of 2 with no age restrictions and DPMM will also not be subject to the same age restrictions as the local S.League clubs. Each local S.League team, apart from the Young Lions, will be required to have at least six under-23 players and eight under-30 players in the squad, with the remaining players to be of any age.

Although they participated in the 2018 Singapore Premier League, finishing in third place below champions Albirex and Home United, DPMM is still considering to join another league. Reports by Singapore press in October 2018 revealed that DPMM have submitted official enquiry to join Thai League 1 for the 2019 season. The club would later announce that they would be competing in the 2019 Singapore Premier League, but afterwards expressed an interest to join Indonesia's Liga 1 in 2020.

On 15 September 2019, DPMM were confirmed to be champions of the 2019 Singapore Premier League after their closest rivals Hougang United only managed to play a 4–4 draw with Geylang International, leaving the Bruneian club with an unassailable four-point lead at the top of the table. They also reached the semi-finals of the Singapore Cup before being eliminated by via penalty shootout to Warriors FC on 30 October.

In 2020, DPMM participated in the Singapore Premier League but could only play one game before the COVID-19 pandemic forced the league to be suspended until October. The team was unable to fulfill the remaining fixtures due to travel restrictions between Brunei and Singapore, resulting in the inevitable exclusion from the year's SPL season.

DPMM once again withdrew from the 2021 Singapore Premier League due to the ongoing travel restrictions imposed by the Brunei government, but not before showing intent to participate in the league.

Return to Brunei
In 2019, DPMM sent a youth team to play in the 2018–19 Brunei Premier League, with three first teamers namely Azim Izamuddin Suhaimi, Abdul Azizi Ali Rahman and Azwan Ali Rahman also registered with the team. They finished in first place at the end of the season, winning promotion to the 2020 Brunei Super League. The 'B' team which began to boast import players like Shuhei Sasahara only completed two games before the season was eventually cancelled due to the COVID-19 pandemic.

Due to the first team's withdrawal from the Singapore Premier League for the 2021 season, head coach Pennock announced that his team will be lacing up for the 2021 Brunei Super League that would commence in June of that year. The league was suspended three months later due to increasing COVID-19 cases in Brunei and was eventually cancelled for the second successive season.

DPMM FC competed in the 2022 Brunei FA Cup which was the only competition to be held for the year by the Football Association of Brunei Darussalam. On 4 December, they became the winners of the competition by beating Kasuka FC in the final with a 2–1 score.

Second stint in Singapore
DPMM FC began the process of returning to the Singapore Premier League after the restrictions necessitated by the pandemic eased since the year 2022. The AFC ratified the move in August of that year. The SGPL officially announced DPMM's participation for the 2023 season on 27 January 2023.

Players

Current squad

League and Cup history

Continental record

Honours

League

Brunei
 Brunei Premier League
 Winners (3): 2002, 2004, 2018-19
 Pepsi Cup League
 Runner-up (1): 2001

Singapore
 S.League/ Singapore Premier League
 Winners (2): 2015, 2019
 Runner-up (2): 2012, 2014

Cups

Brunei

 Pengiran Sengamara Di Raja Cup
 Runner-up (1): 2000
 DPMM FC Invitational Cup
 Winners (1): 2002
 Brunei Super Cup
 Winners (2): 2002, 2004
 Brunei FA Cup
 Winners (2): 2004, 2022

Singapore
 Singapore Cup
 Runner-up (1): 2018
 Singapore League Cup
 Winners (3): 2009, 2012, 2014
 Runner-up (2): 2013, 2016
 Singapore Community Shield
 Runner-up (1): 2016

Club officials

References

External links

 DPMM Official Fansite

 
Football clubs in Brunei
Foreign teams in Singapore football leagues
Expatriated football clubs
Association football clubs established in 2000
2000 establishments in Brunei
Singapore Premier League clubs